Predrag Luka (born 11 May 1988) is a Serbian footballer who plays as a winger for Mladi radnik.

Club career

Mladi radnik
Luka had played with FK Mladi radnik between 2004 and 2010, having played a total of 140 league matches and scored 29 goals for them. In 2009, he was a part of squad that achieved the greatest success in Mladi radnik history, promotion to SuperLiga. After one year, the club was relegated, and Luka found himself a place in another SuperLiga side, Rad Beograd.

Rad
He spent three years at the club, where he played 65 matches and scored 12 goals. In May 2011, during the game against Smederevo, his former teammate from Mladi Radnik, Miloš Radosavljević tackled Luka in a manner that broke his leg, which ended up being a season-ending injury.

Partizan
On February 2, 2013, he signed a 3.5-year contract with Partizan Belgrade upon being promoted with Nemanja Kojić to the club. On August 7, 2013, Luka scored his first goal for Partizan in a 2-0 win against FK Donji Srem.

Career statistics

Honours
Partizan Belgrade
 Serbian SuperLiga: 2012–13, 2014–15

Personal life
Luka is Serbian Romani. His family is Serbian Orthodox and has the slava (patron saint) of Parascheva. He was brought up in the Burdelj mala settlement in Požarevac. His favourite team is Partizan.

References

External links
 
 Predrag Luka stats at utakmica.rs 
 

1988 births
Living people
Sportspeople from Požarevac
Serbian Romani people
Serbian footballers
Romani footballers
FK Partizan players
FK Rad players
FK Mladi Radnik players
FK Mladost Lučani players
OFK Beograd players
Serbian First League players
Serbian SuperLiga players
Association football midfielders
FK Temnić players